Sekolah Menengah Kebangsaan Damansara Jaya (SMKDJ), also known as Damansara Jaya Secondary School, is a secondary school situated in Damansara Jaya, Petaling Jaya, Selangor, Malaysia. It was awarded the Cluster School of Excellence status in 2013 by the Malaysian Ministry of Education.

History 
The school received its first intake of Form 1 students in 1983. The pioneer batch of students came mainly from SRK Damansara Utama and SRK Sultan Alam Shah 1 & 2, and there were also students from Sri Petaling and Kg Tengku primaries. The first headmaster of the school was Hj Abu Sujak, but the most memorable was Kevin De Souza (deceased). Pn Hjh. Naimah (deceased), who was assistant head during the school's early days, went on to become headmistress of the nearby SK Damansara Jaya many years later. The pioneer batch of teachers included Hjh Zuraidah, B.H. Lim, Raoul Huet, Imam Musaniff, Pn. Salina, Cikgu Rosli, Cikgu Syahrim, Pn. Loke, Pn. Leela and Pn Ooi.

The first student to be appointed head prefect was Syed Nasurudin Syed Abu Bakar, followed by Megat Fairuz Khairudin. The straight A students among the pioneers were consistently Chuah Beng Sim and Irene Siow Ai Ling. In 1987, the school celebrated the victory of one of its students in a yachting competition at the Olympics.

The school is rated as one of the best in Malaysia based on public examination results.

Early school students designed the school badge and composed the school song and lyrics. K. Thanalechumy won an art competition to design the school badge while Nicholas Ong composed the school anthem Berilmu Untuk Berjasa.

Demographics
The school's population is 46% Chinese, 40% Malays, 14% Indians and numerous other races.

Notable people

Alumni 
 Heidy Quah – Queen's Young Leader Award 2017 recipient, founder and director of Refuge for the Refugees, a non-profit NGO that provides education for refugee children, as well as raising their standard of living.
 Hasnol Hassan Ariff – A male singer from Malaysia. He was won third place at the Sony Music Voice of Asia in 1991.
 Sofia Jane Hisham – Actress and former model.
 Melissa Saila – Singer and actress
 Shahrizan 
 Eric Yeo – Saloon car driver and racer
 Chow Yan Kit † – Motorcycle rider and racer

See also
 Education in Malaysia

External links

References 

Schools in Selangor
Secondary schools in Malaysia